Nathan Cohen may refer to:

Nathan Cohen (critic), Canadian theatre critic and broadcaster
Nathan Cohen (rower), New Zealand Olympic and world champion rower